Şahika Ercümen (born 16 January 1985) is a Turkish dietitian and world record holder free-diver.

Born on January 16, 1985, in Çanakkale, she was educated at the Gazi Primary School, and received a secondary education at the Milli Piyango Anatolian High School in her hometown. For her higher education, she moved to Ankara, and became a dietitian graduating from the Department of Nutrition and Dietetics at Başkent University's Faculty of Health Sciences.

Her participation in underwater sports began with scuba diving and underwater rugby. For twelve years, she is interested in various branches of underwater sports, and is a member of four national teams since 2001. She participated with the underwater hockey, underwater rugby, underwater orienteering and free diving national teams in the World and European Championships.

Achievements

Şahika Ercümen is former world record holder of constant weight with fins at sea (CWT) discipline with  set in Dahab, Egypt on November 10, 2011 (recognized by CMAS).

She stated that she preferred the site for her world-record free-diving attempt because she wanted to call world's attention to the migration of Pearl Mullet (Chalcalburnus tarichi), also called Lake Van fish.

She set a new free-diving world record in the VNF discipline reaching the  depth mark in 2:49 minutes at Kaş, Antalya, southern Turkey on July 23, 2014. Former record in this discipline, which was set the previous year, belonged to Derya Can, another Turkish diver.

Her record was recognized by CMAS officials at site.

World records
 DYN under ice
 - February 11, 2011 in Lake Weissensee, Austria
CWT
 - November 10, 2011 in Dahab, Egypt
VNF
 - November 10, 2011 in Dahab, Egypt
 - June 1, 2013 in Lake Van, Turkey
 - July 23, 2014 in Kaş, Antalya, Turkey
 - October 26, 2021 in Kaş, Antalya, Turkey
VWT
 - October 22, 2016 in Kaş, Antalya, Turkey
 Sweet water
 - October 26, 2018 in Lake Salda, Yeşilova, Burdur, Turkey

References

External links
Official Website

Living people
1985 births
Turkish freedivers
Turkish sportswomen
Sportspeople from Çanakkale
Başkent University alumni
Dietitians